At least two warships of Japan have been named Wakashio:

, a  launched in 1961 and struck in 1979.
, a  launched in 1993 and struck in 2013.

See also
 Wakashio (ship)

Japanese Navy ship names
Japan Maritime Self-Defense Force ship names